The Men's 3000 metres steeplechase competition at the 2012 Summer Olympics in London, United Kingdom. The event was held at the Olympic Stadium on 3–5 August.

The steeplechase has become a national event of Kenya.  Their team tactics dominate major championship races.  For the first 5 laps, they let others dominate the lead, primarily led by Americans Donald Cabral and Evan Jager.  Then the Kenyans decided to move as a team, leaving the field to chase.  With less than 800 metres to go, Ugandan Benjamin Kiplagat got tangled up on a barrier and fell flat on his face, the runners behind him having to scramble.  200 metres later, Kenyan Brimin Kipruto fell.  Though he quickly scrambled to his feet, that effectively ruined the chances for a Kenyan sweep.  Still the other two led through the final lap.  Former gold medalist and multiple world champion Ezekiel Kemboi pulled away off the front.  As Abel Mutai began to falter, Mahiedine Mekhissi-Benabbad sprinted past to repeat his silver medal.  Kemboi's lead was secure and after clearing the final barrier, he began to celebrate, drifting out to lane 8 by the time he crossed the finish line.

After the finish, Kemboi did the victory dance he has become known for.  He and Mekhissi-Benabbad exchanged jerseys and the diminutive Kemboi leaped into the much larger Mekhissi-Benabbad's arms.

Competition format

The Men's 3000 m steeplechase competition consists of heats (Round 1) and a Final.

Schedule

All times are British Summer Time (UTC+1)

Records
, the existing World and Olympic records were as follows.

The following National records were set during this competition.

Results

Round 1

Qual. rule: first 4 of each heat (Q) plus the 3 fastest times (q) qualified.

Heat 1

Heat 2

Heat 3

Final

* Infringement of the inside border.

References

Athletics at the 2012 Summer Olympics
Steeplechase at the Olympics
Men's events at the 2012 Summer Olympics